Drivers is an unincorporated community in Jefferson County, in the U.S. state of Illinois.

History
A post office was established at Drivers in 1888, and remained in operation until 1907. James R. Driver, the first postmaster, gave the community his name.

References

Unincorporated communities in Jefferson County, Illinois
Unincorporated communities in Illinois